Alice D'Amato (born 7 February 2003) is an Italian artistic gymnast.  She represented Italy at the 2020 Olympic Games.  She was a member of the teams that won bronze at the 2019 World Championships in Stuttgart, Germany and gold at the 2022 European Championships.  Individually she is the 2019 European bronze medalist and the 2022 European silver medalist on the uneven bars.  She is the twin sister of Asia D'Amato.

Early life
D'Amato and her twin sister, Asia, were born in Genoa, Italy on 7 February 2003. She and her sister began gymnastics at the age of 7 at the Andrea Doria Sports Club in Genoa, Italy. They currently train at the International Academy of Brixia in Brescia.

In December 2020, Alice and Asia received the Athlete of the Year award in the Liguria region of Italy.

Gymnastics career

Junior

2015–2017 
D'Amato made her international debut at the 2015 City of Jesolo Trophy as part of Italy's Young Dreams team alongside Giorgia Villa and her twin sister Asia D'Amato. D'Amato was injured for most of 2016 but competed at the Italian Event Championships where she placed first on uneven bars.

In 2017 D'Amato competed at the Mediterranean Junior Championships where she won silver in the all-around behind Elisa Iorio and won gold in the team final.  She later competed at the Italian National Championships where she placed third in the all-around and on balance beam.  She later competed at the 2017 European Youth Olympic Festival alongside Elisa Iorio and Asia D'Amato.  There she helped Italy win silver behind Russia.  Individually she qualified to the uneven bars final but was withdrawn from the final so her teammate Iorio, who would later win gold, could compete.

2018
D'Amato competed at the Italian Championships where she won silver on the uneven bars.  In August D'Amato competed at the 2018 European Women's Artistic Gymnastics Championships alongside Asia D'Amato, Alessia Federici, Elisa Iorio, and Giorgia Villa where Italy won team gold.

Senior

2019
In April D'Amato was officially named to the team to compete at the 2019 European Championships alongside Giorgia Villa, Elisa Iorio and Asia D'Amato.  There she qualified to the all-around final and to the uneven bars final. During the all-around final D'Amato finished in fourth place after falling off the balance beam behind Mélanie de Jesus dos Santos of France, Ellie Downie of Great Britain, and Angelina Melnikova of Russia.  The following day she won the bronze medal on the uneven bars behind Russians Anastasia Ilyankova and Melnikova.  In doing so, D'Amato became the first Italian to win a European Championships medal on the apparatus.

In August D'Amato competed at the Heerenveen Friendly where she helped Italy win gold in the team competition ahead of the Netherlands and Norway and individually she finished fourth in the all-around behind Villa, Eythora Thorsdottir, and Naomi Visser.  Additionally she recorded the highest vault and uneven bars scores.  On September 4 D'Amato was named to the team to compete at the 2019 World Championships in Stuttgart, Germany alongside Giorgia Villa, Asia D'Amato, Elisa Iorio, and Desirée Carofiglio.

During qualifications at the World Championships D'Amato helped Italy qualify to the team final in eighth place; as a result Italy also qualified to the 2020 Olympic Games in Tokyo. In the team final, D'Amato helped Italy win the bronze medal – Italy's first team medal since the 1950 World Artistic Gymnastics Championships.  They ended up finishing behind the United States and Russia but ahead of China, who originally qualified to the final in second place.

2020
In early February it was announced that D'Amato was selected to represent Italy at the Birmingham World Cup taking place in late March.  She was later replaced by Desiree Carofiglio.  However the Birmingham World Cup was later canceled due to the COVID-19 pandemic in the United Kingdom.

2021
In April D'Amato was selected to represent Italy at the European Championships in Basel alongside Giorgia Villa, Martina Maggio, and Vanessa Ferrari.  During qualifications D'Amato placed 18th in the all-around but did not qualify to the final due to Maggio and Ferrari placing higher.  She did, however, qualify to the uneven bars final.  During the uneven bars final D'Amato placed fifth.

D'Amato was named to the team to represent Italy at the 2020 Summer Olympics in Tokyo, Japan alongside Asia D'Amato, Giorgia Villa (later replaced by Vanessa Ferrari), and Martina Maggio. The four qualified for the team finals and placed fourth with a total score of 163.638.  She placed 20th in the individual all-around.

In October D'Amato was selected to compete at the 2021 World Championships.  She finished eighth in the all-around.

2022

In June D'Amato competed at the Mediterranean Games alongside Martina Maggio, Angela Andreoli, Asia D'Amato, and Giorgia Villa.  Together they won gold in the team competition, over five points ahead of second place France.  In August D'Amato competed at the European Championships.  She contributed scores on vault, uneven bars, and floor exercise towards Italy's first-place finish.  During event finals D'Amato won silver on the uneven bars behind Elisabeth Seitz of Germany.

In October D'Amato competed at the Italian National Championships.  She placed second in the all-around and on floor exercise behind Maggio.  D'Amato was later named to the team to compete at the World Championships in Liverpool alongside Maggio, Villa, Manila Esposito, Veronica Mandriota, and alternate Elisa Iorio.  Together they finished fifth as a team.  Individually D'Amato qualified to the all-around and floor exercise finals and was the first reserve for the uneven bars final.  She finished tenth in the all-around and withdrew from the floor exercise final so compatriot Maggio could compete instead.

2023 
D'Amato competed at the Cottbus World Cup where she finished first on uneven bars and fourth on floor exercise.

Competitive history

References 

2003 births
Living people
Italian female artistic gymnasts
Medalists at the World Artistic Gymnastics Championships
European champions in gymnastics
Sportspeople from Genoa
Italian twins
Twin sportspeople
Gymnasts at the 2020 Summer Olympics
Olympic gymnasts of Italy
Mediterranean Games gold medalists for Italy
Mediterranean Games medalists in gymnastics
Gymnasts at the 2022 Mediterranean Games
21st-century Italian women